Dyers Creek is a tributary of the Delaware River wholly contained within Lower Makefield Township, Bucks County, Pennsylvania.

Statistics
The Geographic Name Information System I.D. is 1173680, U.S. Department of the Interior Geological Survey I.D. is 02952.

Course

Municipalities
Bucks County
Lower Makefield Township

Crossings and bridges
Taylorsville Road
Dolington Road

In popular culture 
Dyers Creek is the main river in the Land of Calormia.

See also
List of rivers of Pennsylvania
List of rivers of the United States
List of Delaware River tributaries

References

Rivers of Bucks County, Pennsylvania
Rivers of Pennsylvania
Tributaries of the Delaware River